"Say You Love Me" is a song written by English singer-songwriter Christine McVie for Fleetwood Mac's 1975 self-titled album. The song peaked at No. 11 on the Billboard Hot 100 for three weeks, and remains one of the band's most recognizable songs. Its success helped the group's eponymous 1975 album sell over eight million copies worldwide.

In the UK, "Say You Love Me" was the fourth single from the Fleetwood Mac album, but the first to chart, peaking at No. 40 on the UK Singles Chart in September 1976. In Canada, Shirley Eikhard covered "Say You Love Me" and released it as a single several weeks in advance of Fleetwood Mac in early June 1976. Eikhard's version became a Canadian top 40, peaking at No. 34; Fleetwood Mac's version, released only a few weeks later, peaked at No. 29 in September.

Background
In addition to its appearance on Fleetwood Mac's self-titled 1975 album, "Say You Love Me" appears on four of the group's compilation albums: Greatest Hits, The Very Best of Fleetwood Mac, 25 Years - The Chain and 50 Years – Don't Stop (with the single version featuring on the latter two). 

McVie wrote "Say You Love Me" after her fifth year in the band while she was married to the group's bassist, John McVie. The version used on the single release has overdubbed additional guitar work and a faster fade-out. The single mix is the one used on the compilation 25 Years - The Chain (as a to 3:45 edited version, which is not available anywhere else).

"Say You Love Me" has been performed on seven of Fleetwood Mac's tours since its release. On The Dance tour, John McVie sang background vocals. Previously, John McVie's only other vocal contribution was on a cover of "Cool Water", the B-side to "Gypsy". During a Q&A session, he stated that his then ex-wife Christine convinced him to perform the vocal line. During the band's Rock and Roll Hall of Fame performance of the song, Mick Fleetwood and Lindsey Buckingham played a cocktail drum kit and banjo respectively. Following Christine McVie's departure from the band, the song was performed on Fleetwood Mac's Unleashed Tour with Stevie Nicks and Lindsey Buckingham sharing lead vocals.

Reception
Billboard praised McVie's singing, noting the "easy" guitar playing, and the "good, catchy bridge."  Cash Box said that "it’s an intelligent and commercial single...the music seems to flow, in mid-tempo rock rhythm; the song has a fat sound" and that "the vocals are distinctive." Record World said that "Christine McVie takes he lead this time and belts out a gutty vocal which is underpinned by chiming guitars and a banjo."

Personnel
Christine McVie – lead vocals, piano
Lindsey Buckingham – vocal harmonies, electric guitar, acoustic guitar, 12-string electric guitar, banjo
Stevie Nicks – harmony vocals
John McVie – bass guitar
Mick Fleetwood – drums, tambourine

Chart performance

Weekly charts
Fleetwood Mac original

Shirley Eikhard cover

Year-end charts

Cover versions
Shirley Eikhard covered the song in 1976.  It became a hit in Canada, spending two weeks at number 34 on the pop singles chart and number four on the Adult Contemporary chart.

In the late half of the 1970s, the song proved to be a popular song to cover in country music. Singer Lynda K. Lance spent five weeks in the fall of 1976 on the American country singles chart with her version, peaking at No. 93. In the fall of 1979, singer Stephanie Winslow scored the only Top 10 country hit of her career, with her cover reaching number 10 on the country charts.

References

The Great Rock Discography, 6th Edition. Martin C.Strong. Page 378.

External links
 
 

1975 songs
1976 singles
Fleetwood Mac songs
Songs written by Christine McVie
Shirley Eikhard songs
Song recordings produced by Keith Olsen
Reprise Records singles